Minerva has been borne by at least three ships of the Italian Navy and may refer to:

 , a  launched in 1892 and discarded in 1921.
 , a  launched in 1942 and decommissioned in 1970.
 , a  launched in 1986 and sold in 2015 to Bangladesh for coastguard service. She was renamed CGS Syed Nazrul. 

Italian Navy ship names